Kilgraston School is a private boarding and day school offering primary school education for boys and girls aged from five to twelve years old and girls only from five to eighteen. Boarding is available for girls only aged eight years old and above.
It is the only Catholic boarding secondary school in Scotland and is located within the Diocese of Dunkeld. The school has links with the boys' school Merchiston Castle School in Edinburgh and occasionally co-organises socials and functions together. Kilgraston has thriving music and arts departments, hockey, tennis and swimming academies, and is Scotland's only school with an on-site equestrian centre. In 2013 Kilgraston was ranked fourth in the top Scottish schools by Advanced Highers. In 2015, Kilgraston was named as the Sunday Times top performing independent school for Highers and Advanced Highers 2015.

The school has Junior Years (ages 5–12), Senior School (ages 13–16) and Sixth Form. It is a member of the Girls' Schools Association.

History

Building 
Kilgraston's earliest records date back to the 13th century where it was called Gilgryston. John Grant, the eldest son of Patrick Grant of Glenlochy, in Strath Spey, Inverness-shire, and whose principal wealth was made in Jamaica, was for several years a member of the Assembly there, becoming an assistant Judge of Jamaica's Supreme Court, and eventually succeeded Thomas French as Chief Justice of that island in January 1783, which office he held until 1790. Also, in 1783, he was confirmed as an armiger by the Lord Lyon King of Arms. Grant purchased, towards the end of the 18th century, from the Murray and Craigie families, the contiguous estates of Kilgraston and Pitcaithly, situated in the east end of the beautiful and rich valley of Strath Earn, and extending over part of the Ochil Hills. He died issueless at Edinburgh on 29 March 1793, and is buried under a marble tablet in St Cuthbert's Churchyard. He was succeeded in his estates by his brother Francis (d. 1819, who built the mansion. The mansion was used as a private home until World War I during which it was used as a hospital.

School 
In 1930 the house and grounds were purchased by the Society of the Sacred Heart and opened as a school with 40 boarders. The Society ran the school as a charitable trust until 2000 when it became a private school. It briefly participated in the Assisted Places Scheme during the 1990s until its abolishment. In 2003, it absorbed the nearby all-girls Butterstone Prep School due to the latter's financial difficulties. Its girls were transferred 22 miles to Kilgraston and one of the boarding houses was named Butterstone after the school.

Capital investments have included the opening of a 25m indoor swimming pool complex and upgrades to the equestrian centre (Kilgraston is the only school in Scotland with equestrian facilities on campus) including a 60m x 40m floodlit arena and a new international sized all-weather floodlit hockey pitch. Other developments have been a new theatre with retractable seating for 150, a bistro style dining room, sports pavilion as well as an ongoing upgrade of the residential facilities. As a member of the Network of Sacred Heart Schools, there are exchange and twinning programmes available for girls to interact with fellow students from sister schools around the world. Sixth Form pupils now have access to their own study centre with individual work stations. In 2014, Professor Yellowlees, Chair of the Royal Society of Chemistry and Vice President and Head of the School of Science and Engineering at Edinburgh University, formally opened Kilgraston's £1million Science Centre.

In January 2012, Kilgraston was named "Independent School of the Year" ahead of 27 other independent schools across Britain at the Independent School Awards. It was also nominated for the Outstanding Strategic Initiative Award in recognition of the changes the school has made to achieve 55% growth in the last five years and received the Outstanding Financial Initiative prize for its £2m investment in facilities and the introduction of a number of Sports Academies.

Academics 
In 2015, the school was Sunday Times top performing independent school for Highers (H) and Advanced Highers (AH) 2015. In August 2016, 65.5% of grades at AH were A grades against a national average of 33.5%. 90.5% of grades were A-B against a national average of 59.3% and 36% of girls are now studying a STEM undergraduate course. 100% of girls in 2016 were accepted into their choice of university.

Boarding 
Boarding is available to girls aged 8 and above. Approximately half of pupils are boarders, most of whom board on weekdays or on flexible arrangements. The girls reside in three boarding houses: Butterstone and Austin (Junior Years), Mater (Senior School) and Barat or Swinton (Sixth Form). Senior School and Sixth Form boarders have their own bedrooms.

Former staff and pupils 
 Louise Baxter, former Scotland international hockey player and Head of PE
 Mairi Gougeon, politician

References

Sources
 Burke, John, Esq., A Genealogical History of The Commoners of Great Britain and Ireland enjoying Territorial Possessions or High Official Rank, London, 1835, volume II, p. 613.
 Smith, John, & Balfour Paul, Sir James, editor, Monumental Inscriptions in St. Cuthbert's Churchyard, Edinburgh, Scottish Record Society, Edinburgh, 1915, p. 13.

External links

Profile on the Independent Schools Council website
Profile on MyDaughter
Profile on Scottish Schools Online
Profile on The Good Schools Guide
2011 HMIE Inspection Report

Sacred Heart schools
Private schools in Perth and Kinross
Boarding schools in Perth and Kinross
Catholic secondary schools in Perth and Kinross
Primary schools in Perth and Kinross
Girls' schools in Perth and Kinross
Category A listed buildings in Perth and Kinross
Catholic primary schools in Scotland
Catholic boarding schools in the United Kingdom
Member schools of the Girls' Schools Association
Educational institutions established in 1930
1930 establishments in Scotland
Bridge of Earn